Shell Lake is a lake in Washburn County, Wisconsin, in the United States. This lake was named for the shape of the lake that resembles the shells of freshwater bivalves. The Shell Lake Municipal Airport is located on a peninsula on the western shoreline of the lake.

See also
List of lakes in Wisconsin

References

Lakes of Wisconsin
Bodies of water of Washburn County, Wisconsin